Arthur Löwenstamm (also spelt Loewenstamm) (20 December 1882– 22 April 1965) was a Jewish theologian,  writer and rabbi in Berlin and in London, where he came in 1939 as a refugee from Nazi Germany.

He was the last rabbi of the Jewish community of Spandau, Germany, which comprised 600 members in 1933.

Early life and education
Arthur Löwenstamm was born on 20 December 1882 in Ratibor, Upper Silesia, German Empire, which is now Racibórz in southern Poland. His parents were Natan Löwenstamm (1856–1937), a shopkeeper, and his wife Johanna Zweig (1851–1936). He was the eldest in the family and had a brother,  Kurt (1883–1965, whose son Heinz A. Lowenstam became a noted paleoecologist and great-granddaughter Lisa Goldstein also became a rabbi), a sister, Gertrud, and another brother, Ernest (1887–1888).

Löwenstamm attended the Royal Gymnasium in Beuthen (now Bytom), Upper Silesia, from 1893 to 1902. He studied philosophy at the University of Wrocław and completed his university studies, obtaining a doctorate, in Erlangen, Bavaria in 1905. He studied theology and trained for the rabbinate at the Jewish Theological Seminary of Breslau (now Wrocław in western Poland).

Career

After passing his rabbinical examinations in 1910, Löwenstamm served as rabbi (from 1911 to 1917) with the Jewish community in Pless (now Pszczyna) in Upper Silesia. On 6 December 1916 he was appointed as Spandau Synagogue's first permanent rabbi. Löwenstamm took up his duties on 1 April 1917 and continued until the autumn of 1938. In this role he also gave religious instruction at Spandau's Kant-Gymnasium. He was a member of the Union of Liberal Rabbis in Germany.

On 9 November 1938 (Kristallnacht) the synagogue, on Lindenufer in Spandau's Old Town, was set on fire. Löwenstamm was tortured, imprisoned and deported to the Sachsenhausen concentration camp, from which he was eventually released. After his release from Sachsenhausen, he and his wife found refuge in the United Kingdom in February 1939 but he was interned for several weeks as an "enemy alien".

After the Second World War, Löwenstamm gave private lessons to several students, including Jakob Josef Petuchowski and Hugo Gryn. From May 1945, he was Research Director at the Society for Jewish Studies and a member of the Association of Rabbis from Germany to London.

Personal life
In Breslau in 1911, he married Gertrud Modlinger (born 14 February 1887 in Gleiwitz, died 3 January 1952 in Richmond, Surrey), the daughter of Markus Modlinger and his wife Recha (née Freund). They had two daughters, Erika who moved to London in 1936 and Gerda who emigrated to Britain in 1938. Their grandchildren and great-grandchildren live in the United Kingdom and in Israel.

Death and legacy

He died in Morris Feinmann House, Manchester on 22 April 1965 and was buried at Hoop Lane Jewish Cemetery in Golders Green, London. His archives were donated to the Leo Baeck Institute New York and to the Wiener Library in London.

At the initiative of the Spandau Borough Council, a memorial tablet was unveiled in 1988 on the site of the former synagogue. A memorial plaque was placed on the pavement in front of Löwenstamm's former home at Feldstraße 11, in Spandau, on 9 November 2005.

On 15 August 2002 a street in Spandau was named Löwenstammstraße ("Löwenstamm Street").

Publications
Löwenstamm was a Biblical scholar, specialising in Samaritan and Karaite literature. He wrote commentaries on Dutch philosopher and jurist Hugo Grotius and the German philosopher Hermann Lotze:

 Republished by Nabu Press: Charleston, South Carolina, 2010; paperback, 60 pages.
"Hugo Grotius' Stellung zum Judentum (Hugo Grotius's attitude toward Judaism)" in Festschrift zum 75-jährigen Bestehen des jüdisch-theologischen Seminars Fraenkelscher Stiftung, Vol. II. Verlag M. & H. Marcus: Breslau, 1929; pp. 295–302, 
"Jüdischer Lebinsstil", Gemeindeblatt für die jüdischen Gemeinden Preussens: Verwaltungsblatt der Preussischen Landesverbandes jüdischer Gemeinden, 1 November 1934 (cited on p. 229 in Rebecca Rovit: The Jewish Kulturbund Theatre Company in Nazi Berlin), University of Iowa Press, 2012. 
"The Society for Jewish Studies" in Festschrift zum 80. Geburtstag von Rabbiner Dr. Leo Baeck am 23. Mai 1953,  London: Council for the Protection of the Rights and Interests of the Jews from Germany, 1953; pp. 98–106.

He also co-wrote a history commemorating 50 years of B'nai B'rith in Germany:
 Alfred Goldschmidt, Arthur Löwenstamm and Paul Rosenfeld: Zum 50 jährigen bestehen des Ordens Bne Briss in Deutschland: UOBB. Frankfurt am Main: Kauffmann, 1933.

Further reading

Ernst Gottfried Lowenthal (1982). Juden in Preussen. Ein biographisches Verzeichnis. (Jews in Prussia. A biographical directory.) Dietrich Riemer Verlag, Berlin,  p. 143. .
Carsten Wilke; Katrin Nele Jansen (2009). Die Rabbiner im Deutschen Reich 1871–1945. (The rabbis of the German Reich 1871–1945.) K. G. Saur Verlag, Munich. .

See also
Movement for Reform Judaism

Notes

References

Further reading
Correspondence between Löwenstamm and the lawyer and historian Franz Kobler in the Franz Kobler Collection 1909–1965

1882 births
1965 deaths
20th-century German male writers
20th-century German rabbis
20th-century German theologians
20th-century Jewish biblical scholars
20th-century Jewish theologians
British Jewish writers
British Reform rabbis
Burials at Golders Green Jewish Cemetery
German Jewish theologians
German Reform rabbis
Jewish emigrants from Nazi Germany to the United Kingdom
Jews and Judaism in Berlin
Kristallnacht
Monuments and memorials in Berlin
People from Racibórz
 
Silesian Jews
Spandau
University of Wrocław alumni